Germany's Next Topmodel, cycle 15 is the fifteenth cycle of Germany's Next Topmodel. It aired on ProSieben in February to May 2020. There is again no jury for this season, each episode has one or more guest judges.

The prizes including a modeling contract worth €140,000 with ONEeins fab Management, a spread and cover in the German Harper's Bazaar, a campaign for Philipp Plein's parfum and a €100,000 cash prize.

The international destinations of this cycle are Santa Cruz, Los Angeles, New York City, London, Milan, Paris, Montego Bay and Ocho Rios.

The winner of this season was 21-year-old Jacqueline Wruck from Kiedrich.

Due to the COVID-19 epidemic in Germany, the live final aired without a live audience in the studio. Furthermore, Heidi Klum joined from Los Angeles via video link due to international travel restrictions. Christian Anwander hosted the final.

Contestants
(ages stated are at start of contest)

Episode summaries

Episode 1: Mädchen, Models, München! 
Original airdate: 

The new season began with a big casting. Then, the girls had to do a fashion show in  Julien MacDonald gowns. The girls got tips and help from star guest Milla Jovovich. After that, 25  girls were chosen by Heidi Klum to be part in the fifteenth cycle of Germany's Next Topmodel.

Special guests: Julien MacDonald & Milla Jovovich

Episode 2: Welcome to the Jungle! 
Original airdate: 

The girls arrived in Costa Rica. There, they had their first big photoshoot with fashion photographer Rankin. Before the shoot, Heidi announced that 3 girls would get a chance to join the competition: Jacky, Maribel and Valeria. At the shoot, the girls had to pose in the jungle in groups with a male model. On the next day, the girls had a quick catwalk teaching with model Stella Maxwell. At elimination, Charlotte, Daria and Nina-Sue were eliminated.

Wildcard: Jacky Wruck, Maribel Sancia Todt & Valeria Zock
Eliminated: Charlotte Steinborn, Daria Cupachin & Nina-Sue Wurm	
Featured photographer: Rankin
Special guest: Stella Maxwell

Episode 3: Das Nacktshooting 
Original airdate: 

The week started with a catwalk training with Heidi. After that, the girls had their next big photoshoot. The girls had to pose nude on the beach with a horse. On the next day, four of the girls (Lucy, Malin, Tamara & Valeria) had a quick catwalk teaching with model Joan Smalls. At elimination, Malin and Saskia were eliminated.

Eliminated: Malin Blumenthal & Saskia Mächler
Featured photographer: Vicky Lawton
Special guest: Joan Smalls

Episode 4: Time for Action! 
Original airdate: 

The week started with a stunt teaching before their next big photoshoot. The girls had an action shoot. They had to jump while posing as action stars. Then, the girls had a workout on the beach. On the next day, the girls had to walk in outfits from The Blonds. At elimination, Alina, Laura and Valeria were eliminated.

Eliminated: Alina Enders, Laura Schäfer & Valeria Zock
Featured photographer: Max Montgomery
Special Guests: The Blonds

Episode 5: Umstyling 
Original airdate: 

The girls arrived in Los Angeles and moved into their model loft. This week was the big makeover. After that, the girls had their sedcard photoshoot. At elimination, it was announced that Heidi couldn't participate at the elimination because she had a parasite. Cassandra, Johanna, Maribel, Marie and Tamara landed in the bottom five but were saved, because Heidi was absent.

Bottom five: Cassandra Feliciano, Johanna Höpfler, Maribel Sancia Todt, Marie Rathay & Tamara Hitz
Eliminated: None
Featured photographer: Christian Anwander
Special Guest: Christian Anwander

Episode 6: Das große Krabbeln 
Original airdate: 

The 6th week started with a catwalk training. Anastasia, Jacky and Lijana were invited for a casting for the German InStyle. Anastasia was booked for the job. Then, the girls had their next photoshoot. They had to pose in a cave with tarantulas, scorpions or cockroaches. After the shoot, Cassandra and Marie were eliminated. At elimination, the girls had to walk in gowns from the designer Peter Dundas. In the end, Pinar and Sarah S. were eliminated.

Booked for job: Anastasia Borisova
Shoot out: Cassandra Feliciano, Johanna Höpfler, Maribel Sancia Todt, Marie Rathay & Tamara Hitz
Eliminated outside of judging panel: Cassandra Feliciano & Marie Rathay
Eliminated: Pinar Aygün & Sarah Sonko
Featured photographer: Lado Alexi
Special Guest: Peter Dundas

Episode 7: Everybody comes to Hollywood! 
Original airdate: 

This week started with a photoshoot. The girls had to portray Marilyn Monroe while posing in a box. On the next day, the girls had an interview challenge. Anastasia, Maribel and Sarah P. struggled the most while Julia P., Tamara and Vivian were declared the winners of the challenge. At elimination, Lucy was eliminated.

Challenge winner: Julia Przybylski, Tamara Hitz & Vivian Cole
Eliminated: Lucy Hellenbrecht
Featured photographer: Yu Tsai
Special Guest: Alessandra Ambrosio

Episode 8: Catwalk-Time! 
Original airdate: 

The week started with a casting for got2b. Tamara was booked for the job. Later, the girls flew to Berlin for Berlin Fashion Week. There, the girls went to 5 different castings. Anastasia, Johanna, Lijana, Maureen and Sarah P. were booked for a job. After this, Mareike decided to quit the competition. At elimination, the girls had to walk in a fashion show in Christian Cowan's designs while posing at the end of the runway for a photoshoot. Julia F. and Maribel landed in the bottom two. In the end, Julia F. was eliminated.

Quit: Mareike Lerch
Booked for job: Anastasia Borisova (2x), Johanna Höpfler, Lijana Kaggwa, Maureen Ugodi, Sarah Posch & Tamara Hitz
Bottom two: Julia Figueroa & Maribel Sancia Todt
Eliminated: Julia Figueroa
Featured photographer: Robert Erdman
Special Guest: Christian Cowan & Nikeata Thompson

Episode 9: Color Splash 
Original airdate: 

The girls moved into their model mansion. After that, the girls had a dance teaching. On their next photoshoot, the girls had to pose in groups while being splashed with colored powder. At elimination, the girls had to perform their dance in groups while musician Ava Max sang. Johanna and Maribel landed in the bottom two. In the end, Johanna was eliminated.

Bottom two: Johanna Höpfler & Maribel Sancia Todt
Eliminated: Johanna Höpfler
Featured photographer: Kristian Schuller
Special Guests: Ava Max & Kristian Schuller

Episode 10: Wild Wild West 
Original airdate: 

The week started with a with another stunt teaching. That week the girls had a video shoot. The girls had to portray cowgirls while acting out a fighting scene. At elimination, the girls had to walk in gowns from designer Jeremy Scott while lip-syncing to their song on the runway. In the end, Bianca was eliminated.

Eliminated: Bianca Eigenfeld
Featured director: Mario Schmolka
Special Guest: Jeremy Scott

Episode 11: Boys Boys Boys! 
Original airdate: 

The next week started with a teaching on how to pose underwater. On the next day, the girls had to pose underwater as princesses with a male model. Then, the girls had a casting for John Frieda. Larissa was booked for the job and got immunity for the next elimination. At elimination, the girls each had to perform a different style of dance. In the end, Julia P. was eliminated.

Booked for job / Immune: Larissa Neumann
Eliminated: Julia Przybylski
Featured photographer: Russell James
Special Guests: Massimo Sinato & Rebecca Mir

Episode 12: Kalendar Girls 
Original airdate: 

The week started with a photoshoot for the amfAR charity calendar. The girls had to pose nude with ballons. After that, Heidi chose Jacky and Tamara to come with her to the amfAR gala. At the fitting for the amfAR gala, designer Christian Siriano booked Jacky for his fashion show. At elimination, the girls had to walk in recycled outfits. The girls also had to make a speech about a personal message. Anastasia, Nadine and Tamara landed in the bottom three. In the end, Nadine was eliminated.

Booked for job: Jacky Wruck
Bottom three: Anastasia Borisova, Nadine Wimmer & Tamara Hitz
Eliminated: Nadine Wimmer
Featured photographer: Brian Bowen Smith
Special Guest: Chiara Ferragni

Episode 13: Over The Edge 
Original airdate: 

The week started with a casting for Dyson. Jacky was booked for the job. After that, the girls had their next photoshoot. The girls had to jump from a platform while being suspended in the air. On the next day, the girls had another dance teaching. At elimination, the girls had to dance and perform in groups. Anastasia, Larissa and Vivian landed in the bottom three. In the end, Vivian was eliminated.

Booked for job: Jacky Wruck
Bottom three: Anastasia Borisova, Larissa Neumann & Vivian Cole
Eliminated: Vivian Cole
Featured photographer: Vijat Mohindra
Special Guest: Nicole Scherzinger

Episode 14: Transformation 
Original airdate: 

The week started with a teaching with former judge Thomas Hayo. On the next day, the girls had their next photoshoot. The girls had to portray aliens while posing with a child. At elimination, Anastasia, Lijana and Maribel landed in bottom three. In the end, Maribel was eliminated.

Bottom three: Anastasia Borisova, Lijana Kaggwa & Maribel Sancia Todt
Eliminated: Maribel Sancia Todt
Featured photographer: Derek Kettela
Special Guest: Thomas Hayo

Episode 15: The cover is yours! 
Original airdate: 

The week started with the biggest photoshoot of the season, the Harper's Bazaar cover shoot. After that, the girls got visits from their family and friends. On the next day, the girls had a casting for Sephora. Maureen was booked for the job. Tamara was booked for a Philipp Plein fashion show. At elimination, the girls walked in August Getty couture dresses. Larissa and Tamara landed in the bottom two. In the end, Larissa was eliminated.

Booked for job: Tamara Hitz & Maureen Ugodi
Bottom three: Anastasia Borisova, Larissa Neumann & Tamara Hitz
Eliminated: Larissa Neumann
Featured photographer: Regan Cameron
Special Guest: August Getty, Coco Rocha & Kerstin Schneider

Episode 16: Halbfinale 
Original airdate: 

The week started with the next photoshoot. The girls had to pose in couture dresses at a height of 15 meters. After the shoot, Tamara was eliminated. On the next day, Heidi visited the girl in their model mansion and did a teaching with them. At elimination, the girls walked in Julien MacDonald dresses and against top model Toni Garrn. Anastasia and Lijana landed in the bottom two. Anastasia was eliminated, making Jacky, Lijana, Maureen and Sarah P. the Top 4.

Shoot-out: Anastasia Borisova & Tamara Hitz
Eliminated outside of judging panel: Tamara Hitz
Bottom two: Anastasia Borisova & Lijana Kaggwa
Eliminated: Anastasia Borisova
Featured photographer: Marc Baptiste
Special Guest: Julien MacDonald & Toni Garrn

Episode 17: Das große Finale 
Original airdate: 

The big finale started with a fashion show. After that, Lijana decided to quit the competition because of the cyberbullying and hate commentary she received over the past few weeks for her behavior on the show. Then, the girls had their last photoshoot. The girls portrayed burlesque girls while posing in a life-sized martini glass. After that, Maureen was eliminated. Next, the remaining two girls had their last fashion show. After the final runway, Jacky was declared the 15th winner of Germany's Next Topmodel.

Final four: Jacky Wruck, Lijana Kaggwa, Maureen Ugodi & Sarah Posch
Quit: Lijana Kaggwa
Final three: Jacky Wruck, Maureen Ugodi & Sarah Posch
Bottom two: Maureen Ugodi & Sarah Posch
Eliminated: Maureen Ugodi 
Personality Award: Tamara Hitz
Final two: Jacky Wruck & Sarah Posch
Germany's Next Topmodel: Jacky Wruck
Featured photographer: Christian Anwander
Special guests: Carina Zavline (Cycle 12), Christian Anwander, Gisele Oppermann (Cycle 3), Jacqueline Thießen (Cycle 8), Klaudia Giez (Cycle 13), Micaela Schäfer (Cycle 1), Nikeata Thompson, Philipp Plein, Rebecca Mir (Cycle 6), Sara Kulka (Cycle 7), Tatjana Wiedemann (Cycle 14), Theresia Fischer (Cycle 14) & Thomas Hayo

Summaries 

 The contestant was eliminated
 The contestant was eliminated outside of judging panel
 The contestant was in danger of elimination
 The contestant won the competition

Photo shoot guide
Episode 2 photo shoot: Posing in the jungle in groups with a male model
Episode 3 photo shoot: Nude on the beach with a horse
Episode 4 photo shoot: Jumping while posing as action stars
Episode 5 photo shoot: Sedcard
Episode 7 photo shoot: Portraying Marilyn Monroe in a box on the Walk of Fame
Episode 8 photo shoot: Posing at the end of the runway in Christian Cowan gowns
Episode 9 photo shoot: Posing in groups while being splashed with colored powder in a desert in groups
Episode 10 video shoot: Portraying cowgirls while acting out a fighting scene
Episode 11 photo shoot: Portraying underwater princesses while posing with a  male model
Episode 12 photo shoot: amfAR charity calendar
Episode 13 photo shoot: Jumping while being suspended in the air
Episode 14 photo shoot: Portraying aliens while posing with a child
Episode 15 photo shoot: Harper's Bazaar cover
Episode 16 photo shoot: Posing in heights & couture dresses
Episode 17 photo shoot: Portraying burlesque girls on top of a life-sized martini glass

Death threats and criticism
Contestant Lijana Kaggwa received death threats after participating in the fifteenth season of Germany's Next Top Model. She told that she was spat on the street and people tried to poison her dog, which led to police protection. She decided to quit at the live final due to these incidents. Christian Vock from web.de criticized the show for not being completely aware of these death threats. He said that the editing room was mainly used to show unpleasant statements from Lijana on TV and thus exaggerate it. Mareike Fangmann from Stern wrote: "The broadcasting channel ProSieben has also a complicity because the broadcaster knows exactly how to cut scenes together in order to identify a clear bitch. Good for the ratings, good for the show. [...] But ProSieben should have protected Lijana beforehand. Could have omitted scenes to protect her and thus incited less hatred."

In May 2022 Lijana Kaggwa (Season 15) who received death threats and had to experience cyberbullying after her participation in Germany's Next Topmodel reveals the inhumane practices of Germany's Next Topmodel in a YouTube video. The video has 2.4 million views in nine days. Nathalie Volk (contestant from Season 9) said that Lijana Kaggwa is telling the truth and furthermore that this show is bullying and assault. There was an incident when Heidi Klum threw her into the pool and threw off color balloons. She was 16 years old at the time and also bled. She said: "I have scars on my body because of Heidi." The broadcaster ProSieben takes legal action against Lijana Kaggwa and Nathalie Volk. Volk said: "I find it unbelievable that the broadcaster would like to report us, Lijana and me. I've also spoken to many Americans here. They are also totally appalled that the broadcaster and the broadcasting group want to sue young women for telling the truth." She also stated that she is still traumatized by the show.

In the course of the allegations of former contestants against the show and Heidi Klum, the Germany-wide very famous Youtuber Rezo also strongly criticized Germany's Next Topmodel and was surprised that the show had not yet been canceled. His video is called: "Abu$e, lies and minors".

In July 2022 after Lijana Kaggwa was sued by the creators for her criticism of the show, the court agreed that Lijana Kaggwa was right on crucial points. She can now officially say and write: "The production of 'Germany's Next Topmodel' manipulated me on the set in such a way that I correspond to the role model of the bitch. Entire actions were given to me.” Lijana Kaggwa can therefore continue to be critical about the show and has just announced another unveiling video on Instagram, which is supposed to be about the court process and the verdict.

In February 2023 Der Spiegel (online) gives a glimpse into the notorious gag contracts that candidates have to sign in order to be able to take part in the Heidi Klum show. According to the Hamburg lawyer Jörg Nabert, these are "illegal gag contracts". The contract binds the women to an agency for two years. A regulation that, according to Nabert, is not customary in the industry. The participants also agree that the recordings "present them in a way that they don't like themselves". According to Der Spiegel (online), the contracts say: "The contributors are aware of any burdens that may result for them". If necessary, “substantive suggestions” would be made and enforced by the show management. Germany's Next Topmodel can thus stylize people like Tessa Bergmeier (Season 4) as "bitches" without them being able to defend themselves effectively afterwards. Heidi Klum's casting show goes further than similar formats with this practice.

In February 2023, the Berliner Zeitung published an article about the show with the headline: "Why isn't Germany’s Next Topmodel actually canceled?" 

In February 2023, the German InTouch wrote: "The willingness to use violence among girls is increasing. They form gangs, bully, hit. Heidi is also partly responsible for the fact that, at least on TV, such behavior should not lead to extra airtime..." The article goes on to say: "With Germany’s Next Topmodel absolutely wrong values ​​​​are conveyed. It gives the impression that bullying is a legitimate means of dealing with each other."

In February 2023, the Neue Osnabrücker Zeitung wrote that Germany’s Next Topmodel is one of the worst trash TV programs on German television. And: "anyone who watches Heidi Klum is just as bad as she is."

In February 2023, the former judge Peyman Armin criticized the show and Heidi Klum as well. He said: "It has become a pure self-portrayal by Heidi. Heidi comes first. Then Heidi and Heidi again. When Heidi Klum is in the foreground and takes care of the slapstick, for sensational shootings and catfights." Part of the episodes are therefore always scenes in which Heidi Klum would blaspheme with jurors about the contestants.

Also in February 2023, former judge Wolfgang Joop criticized the show and Heidi Klum again when he said he had no say in the decisions. "Heidi does that. Nobody can help there." Not even the producers were allowed to have a say, apart from the timing of the direction. Joop: "Then they say something like: 'Don't let her go yet, the boyfriend will come, that'll bring a lot of tears of joy, we'll take that with us.'" He added: "I wouldn't have been surprised if the show had been discontinued."

In February 2023 at the beginning of the 18th season, Heidi Klum gave a 10-minute speech in which she denied all allegations against her and the show and blamed the candidates themselves. This was once again heavily criticized by both the viewers and the media in Germany. The Berliner Morgenpost wrote: "Everything is wrong, says Klum. She emphasized that 'everything is real' on her show. There is no text or storyline for the models. That's why it's not her fault if a young model feels misrepresented after the broadcast. 'We can only portray a person as they are,' philosophizes Klum. Whether this is true remains questionable. On the one hand, because a story can be cobbled together afterwards that doesn't have to have anything to do with reality. On the other hand, because in the show very young girls in absolutely exceptional and stressful situations meet experienced editors who know exactly what the viewers later want to see on television." Die Welt called Heidi Klum's statement "bizarre". Frankfurter Allgemeine called it a "Catwalk of Shame". Web.de headlined: "Why Heidi Klum's statement is dishonest". Annabelle (magazine) (Switzerland) headlined: "Heidi Klum, this justification went wrong". In an article, Puls24 (Austria) asked whether Heidi Klum practiced perpetrator-victim reversal and Gaslighting. Frankfurter Allgemeine headlined: "This woman only has dollar signs in her eyes" and also assumed that Heidi Klum was doing a perpetrator-victim reversal. BILD asked: "How evil is Heidi Klum really?".

In March 2023 former judge Peyman Armin apologized to Lijana Kaggwa for what she had to experience on Germany's Next Topmodel. He also apologized for being part of Germany's Next Topmodel and promised to never take part in the show again. All of this was broadcast in the format "13 questions" on ZDF.

References

External links 

2020 German television seasons
Germany's Next Topmodel
Television shows filmed in Costa Rica
Television shows filmed in Los Angeles
Television shows filmed in New York City
Television shows shot in London
Television shows filmed in Italy
Television shows filmed in France
Television shows filmed in Jamaica
Television series impacted by the COVID-19 pandemic